Lyons Switch is a census-designated place (CDP) in Adair County, Oklahoma, United States. The population was 288 at the 2010 census.

Geography
Lyons Switch is located at  (35.769157, -94.707655).

Demographics

As of the census of 2000, there were 227 people, 90 households, and 68 families residing in the CDP. The population density was 27.4 people per square mile (10.6/km2). There were 101 housing units at an average density of 12.2/sq mi (4.7/km2). The racial makeup of the CDP was 48.02% White, 42.73% Native American, and 9.25% from two or more races. Hispanic or Latino of any race were 0.88% of the population.

There were 90 households, out of which 32.2% had children under the age of 18 living with them, 53.3% were married couples living together, 14.4% had a female householder with no husband present, and 24.4% were non-families. 23.3% of all households were made up of individuals, and 12.2% had someone living alone who was 65 years of age or older. The average household size was 2.52 and the average family size was 2.93.

In the CDP, the population was spread out, with 27.3% under the age of 18, 4.4% from 18 to 24, 23.3% from 25 to 44, 30.4% from 45 to 64, and 14.5% who were 65 years of age or older. The median age was 40 years. For every 100 females, there were 104.5 males. For every 100 females age 18 and over, there were 111.5 males.

The median income for a household in the CDP was $26,458, and the median income for a family was $31,667. Males had a median income of $26,250 versus $16,250 for females. The per capita income for the CDP was $15,148. About 6.7% of families and 11.5% of the population were below the poverty line, including 15.6% of those under the age of eighteen and 14.3% of those 65 or over.

References

Census-designated places in Adair County, Oklahoma
Census-designated places in Oklahoma